Cycling at the 2015 African Games in Brazzaville was held between September 10–13, 2015.

Medal summary

Medal table

Road cycling

References

2015 African Games
2015